Domanek (1054–55) was a Serbian nobleman. After a revolt and the murder of the Prince of Travunia (ca. 1054-1055), the rebel nobles made Domanek the ruler of Travunia, a Serbian principality.  He was possibly a son of Ljutovid, the strategos of Serbia (fl. 1039-1042).

Life

According to the Chronicle of the Priest of Dioclea (a dubious manuscript allegedly written at the turn of the 14th century), when Stefan Vojislav, the Grand Prince of Duklja, died, the lands were divided between his widow and five sons. Gojislav received the Trebinje region. The local nobles eventually rose up and killed him. The nobles then set up one of their own, Domanek, as prince, in ca. 1054.

Mihailo I, the holder of Duklja (the crownland), and two of his brothers, led an attack into Travunia, capturing the murderers and giving "them a horrible death". Domanek fled the lands, and Saganek, another brother of Mihailo, succeeded as the rightful Prince of Travunia. Domanek returned shortly after Mihailo's departure, and expelled Saganek. Mihailo offered the office to Radoslav, who declined, afraid of losing Luška župa (future Zeta). Radoslav perhaps distrusted his brother, thinking he would seize Zeta, but Mihailo seems to have offered him a deal.

The Byzantine Empire, wanting to take advantage of the death of Stefan Vojislav, prepared an offensive against unstable Duklja. At this time, the four remaining brothers made peace and established an alliance. The treaty concluded is the oldest in Serbian history. After the agreement, Radoslav attacked Trebinje, killing Domanek. Radoslav went on to conquer Zahumlje.

References

Sources
 
 Paul Stephenson, Byzantium's Balkan frontier: a political study of the Northern Balkans, 900-1204

Further reading
 

11th-century Serbian nobility
People from Trebinje
Serbs of Bosnia and Herzegovina
Serbian rebels
11th-century deaths